Teodor Obadal (born 8 September 2001) is a Serbian professional footballer who plays as a goalkeeper for Serbian club FK Kabel.

Early life
Born and raised in Belgrade, Obadal joined the FK Lokomotiva Belgrad academy when he was nine years old. Afterwards, he joined the academy of FK Čukarički where he played for three years, before returning to the FK Lokomotiva Belgrad system when he was fourteen.

Career

Club
After debuting at age 16 and more than 70 appearances for Serbian 3rd tier side Lokomotiva Beograd, Obadal left Serbia and signed with Canadian Premier League side Atlético Ottawa. He made his debut for Ottawa on August 21 in a Canadian Championship match against Valour FC.

International
In 2019, Obadal was called up to the Serbia U-19 squad for three friendlies. He is also eligible for Canada through his mother, and holds Canadian citizenship.

References

External links
 

Living people
2001 births
Footballers from Belgrade
Serbian footballers
Serbian people of Czech descent
Association football goalkeepers
Atlético Ottawa players
Canadian Premier League players
Expatriate soccer players in Canada
Serbian expatriate footballers
Serbian expatriate sportspeople in Canada